Karla Daniella Villarreal Benassini (born 20 February 1975) is a Mexican politician from the New Alliance Party. From 2009 to 2012 she served as Deputy of the LXI Legislature of the Mexican Congress representing the Federal District.

References

1975 births
Living people
Politicians from Mexico City
Women members of the Chamber of Deputies (Mexico)
New Alliance Party (Mexico) politicians
21st-century Mexican politicians
21st-century Mexican women politicians
Deputies of the LXI Legislature of Mexico
Members of the Chamber of Deputies (Mexico) for Mexico City